The Australia women's national field hockey team (nicknamed the Hockeyroos) are, as of January 2019, ranked third in the world. Having played their first game in 1914, and their first Olympic game in 1984, they are one of Australia's most successful sporting teams, boasting three Olympic gold medals (1988, 1996, 2000), two World Cup gold medals (1994, 1998) and four Commonwealth Games gold medals (1998, 2006, 2010, 2014). The Hockeyroos have been crowned Australia's Team of the Year five times and were unanimously awarded Best Australian Team at the 2000 Sydney Olympic Games.

A notable part of the Hockeyroos colourful history has involved Ric Charlesworth. Charlesworth was at the helm of the Hockeyroos from 1993 to 2000, where his reign as coach saw the team win the 1993, 1995, 1997 and 1999 Champions Trophies, 1994 and 1998 World Cups and the 1998 Commonwealth Games.  Charlesworth took the Hockeyroos to the Atlanta and Sydney Olympic Games, where the team won back-to-back gold medals. The team was coached from 2011 by Adam Commens, who was replaced after the 2016 Summer Olympics, where the side failed to medal, by Paul Gaudoin.

Amid much turmoil, Gaudoin quit in March 2021 and was replaced by former player Katrina Powell.

Given the extent of the Hockeyroos success, the team has consistently remained at the top of the world hockey rankings. From the late 1980s until 2000, the Australian team was ranked at number 1 in the world. Only once during this period, did the Hockeyroos fail to win a tournament, when they finished fifth.

Great Hockeyroos

Rechelle Hawkes
As part of the Olympic team in 1988, 1992, 1996 and 2000, Rechelle Hawkes is the most decorated Hockeyroo of all time. Such is her status in international hockey that she is among the most successful female players in the history of the sport.
Hawkes is the only female hockey player to win three Olympic gold medals at three separate games. After 279 international matches,
Hawkes retired following the Sydney Olympic Games where the Hockeyroos again won gold. In recognition of her contribution to
Australian sport, Rechelle was inducted into the Sport Australia Hall of Fame in 2002. In 2018, Hawkes was made a Member of the Order of Australia for "significant service to hockey."

Alyson Annan
Alyson Annan is also one of more prominent figures in the history of the Hockeyroos. Annan debuted in the Australian side at the age of 18 and became renowned for her prowess in front of goal, scoring 166 goals during her career. She was widely regarded as the sharpest shooter in international women's hockey during the 1990s which was acknowledged when she won the World Hockey Player of the Year in 1999. Annan represented Australia 228 times, and was part of the 1996 and 2000 Olympic Gold Medal-winning teams. Annan remains the Hockeyroos highest goal scorer.

Nikki Hudson
As a highly recognised Hockeyroo, Nikki Hudson has become one of the most identifiable Australian athletes. Retiring in 2009, the striker was formerly the highest capped player in the history of the Hockeyroos, finishing on 303 games (at the time, being the only Hockeyroo to play over 300 games). Since her debut in 1993 at the age of 17, Hudson scored 99 goals in international competition. In 2008, she played in her third successive Olympic Games.

Madonna Blyth
Following her debut in 2004, Madonna Blyth became one of the most prominent Hockeyroos in history. Retiring in 2016, the midfielder became the highest-capped player in the history of the Hockeyroos, finishing on 342 games, surpassing the record previously set by Nikki Hudson. During her career, she won three Commonwealth Games gold medals and two World Cup silvers. She was also the captain of the team from 2009 until her retirement in 2016, following the Olympic Games.

The Hockeyroos today

Following the 2016 Summer Olympics, many of the Hockeyroos' core players retired, forcing the team into a development phase. In 2017, long-time player Emily Chalker was named captain of the team during this rebuilding phase. Following a disappointing Hockey World League campaign, the team won the Oceania Cup, sparking what would become a string of successes for the team.

The Hockeyroos played three major tournaments in 2018, winning silver medals at the Commonwealth Games and Champions Trophy. The team only failed to medal at the World Cup, where they finished fourth.

Following her return to the squad in 2018, Jodie Kenny was named as a co-captain of the team, along with Emily Chalker and Georgina Morgan. The team started 2019 with an historic 1–0 victory over world number one, the Netherlands in the FIH Pro League, this marked their first win over the Dutch since the 2009 Champions Trophy. At the conclusion of the group stage of the FIH Pro League, the Hockeyroos finished in third place, qualifying for the Grand Final and the FIH Olympic Qualifiers.

Tournament records

Team

Current squad
The following 26 players were named in the Hockeyroos squad for the test series against China in Bunbury and Perth, from 23–26 March.

Caps and goals are current as of 4 March 2023 after the match against the United States.

Head coach: Katrina Powell

The following players make up the remainder of the 2023 national squad.

Records

Results

Past results

Australia women's national field hockey team results (2001–05)
Australia women's national field hockey team results (2006–10)
Australia women's national field hockey team results (2011–15)
Australia women's national field hockey team results (2016–20)

2023 Fixtures and Results

FIH Pro League (Home Series)

China Test Series

FIH Pro League (New Zealand Leg)

India Test Series

FIH Pro League (Europe Leg)

XII Oceania Cup

Other programs

National development squad
In addition to the core 22 player squad, Hockey Australia also maintains a 18 player development squad. The 2023 squad is as follows:

 Alice Arnott
 Maddison Brooks
 Olivia Downes
 Rachel Frusher 
 Morgan Gallagher
 Rene Hunter (GK)
 Carly James
 Alana Kavanagh 
 Josie Lawton 
 Liné Malan 
 Phillipa Morgan 
 Zoe Newman (GK)
 Meg Pearce
 Maddison Smith
 Shanea Tonkin
 Aisling Utri
 Abigail Wilson
 Georgia Wilson

See also
Kookaburras – Australia men's national field hockey team
Australian field hockey players
Australia women's national under-21 field hockey team
Australian Hockey League
Australia women's national indoor hockey team

References

External links

Official website
FIH profile

 
 
Oceanian women's national field hockey teams
1914 establishments in Australia